Joshua Kelman Reid (born 3 May 2002) is a Scottish professional footballer who plays as a defender for EFL League Two club Stevenage on loan from Championship club Coventry city

Career

Ross County
Reid began his career at Ross County joining the Academy in 2010 playing at various youth levels before being called up to the first team in the summer of 2020 following regular left back Sean Kelly's departure from the club. He made his debut for Ross County against Motherwell in the opening day of the Scottish Premiership season, starting the game in left-back. Five days later he started in County's 1-0 Win away to Hamilton Academical establishing himself as the clubs regular left back.

Coventry City
On 28 January 2021, Reid joined English side Coventry City for an undisclosed fee, on a three and a half year deal.

Stevenage loan
Reid joined EFL League Two club Stevenage on loan from Coventry City until the end of the 2022/23 season.

Career statistics

References

Living people
2002 births
Scottish footballers
Ross County F.C. players
Coventry City F.C. players
Association football fullbacks
Scottish Professional Football League players
Scotland under-21 international footballers